United of Thanlyin Football Club()  is a Burmese football club, founded in 2015. This is the first time MNL-2 season of United of Thanlyin FC.

Current squad

References

External links

 First Eleven Journal in Burmese
 Soccer Myanmar in Burmese

Football clubs in Myanmar
Association football clubs established in 2009
Myanmar National League clubs
2009 establishments in Myanmar